Serby may refer to:

People
Clay Serby (born 1950), Canadian provincial politician
Steve Serby, American sports reporter

Places in Poland
Serby, Lower Silesian Voivodeship, a village
Stare Serby, a village of the Lower Silesian Voivodeship

Occupational surnames